Three Mile Ditch is the third studio album by English rock band The Wytches. It was released on 13 November 2020 through Cable Code Records. Recording sessions took place at Tile House Studios in London during Autumn 2019.

Track listing

Personnel 
 Kristian Bell – vocals, lyrics, guitar, drums, mellotron, Rhodes
 Dan Rumsey – bass, drums, guitar
 Mark Breed – guitar, bass, drums, Hammond, mellotron
 Luke Oldfield – piano, tambourine, farfisa, whistle, mellotron, warpspeed, recording, mixing
 Noel Summerville – mastering
 Samuel Gull – artwork, design

References 

2020 albums